Espen Andersen (born 28 October 1993) is a Norwegian nordic combined skier.

Career
At the 2012 Junior World Championships, he won a bronze medal in the 5 km Gundersen event and a fourth place in the team competition and fifth in the 10 km. At the 2013 Junior World Championships, he managed sixth place. At the 2013 Winter Universiade, he finished 20th in mass start, seventh in Gundersen, and fourth in the team competition.

He made his FIS Alpine Ski World Cup debut in March 2013 in Oslo, with a 47th place, and collected his first World Cup points with a 20th-place finish in March 2014—also in Oslo. He first made the top 15 with a 12th place in January 2015 in Sapporo.

He hails from Bærum, represents the sports club Lommedalens IL but relocated to Lillehammer to train.

World Cup wins

References

External links
 
 

1993 births
Living people
Sportspeople from Bærum
Norwegian male Nordic combined skiers
Nordic combined skiers at the 2018 Winter Olympics
Nordic combined skiers at the 2022 Winter Olympics
Olympic Nordic combined skiers of Norway
Olympic gold medalists for Norway
Olympic silver medalists for Norway
Olympic medalists in Nordic combined
Medalists at the 2018 Winter Olympics
Medalists at the 2022 Winter Olympics
FIS Nordic World Ski Championships medalists in Nordic combined
21st-century Norwegian people